From Me to You is the tenth studio album by American keyboardist and record producer George Duke. It was released in 1977 through Epic Records, making it his debut release for the label. Recording sessions for the album took place at Paramount Recording Studios in Los Angeles, California. The album features contributions from several musicians, including vocalist Dianne Reeves, guitarist Michael Sembello, bassist Stanley Clarke, drummer Leon "Ndugu" Chancler, percussionist Emil Richards, saxophonist Ernie Watts, trombonist Glenn Ferris, trumpeter Bobby Bryant, cellist Ray Kelley and others.

Reaching a peak position of number 192 on the US Billboard 200, the album remained on the chart for a total of three weeks. The album spawned one single, "'Scuse Me Miss".

Track listing

Personnel 

 George Duke – vocals, keyboards, percussion (5), arrangements 
 Michael Sembello – acoustic guitar, electric guitar
 Stanley Clarke – acoustic bass (1, 8), electric bass (7, 9)
 Byron Lee Miller – electric bass (2-6, 10) 
 Leon "Ndugu" Chancler – drums
 Emil Richards – percussion (1, 6, 8)
 William Green – flute (1, 2, 4, 7, 10), piccolo flute (1, 2, 4, 7, 10), saxophone (1, 2, 4, 7, 10)
 Ernie Watts – flute (1, 2, 4, 7, 10), piccolo flute (1, 2, 4, 7, 10), saxophone (1, 2, 4, 7, 10)
 Glenn Ferris – trombone (1, 2, 4, 7, 10)
 Lew McCreary – trombone (1, 2, 4, 7, 10)
 Bobby Brant – trumpet (1, 2, 4, 7, 10)
 Walt Fowler – trumpet (1, 2, 4, 7, 10)
 Murray Adler – strings (1, 5-7)
 Pamela Goldsmith – strings (1, 5-7)
 Allan Harshman – strings (1, 5-7)
 Jacqueline Lustgarten – strings (1, 5-7)
 Raymond Kelley – strings (1, 5-7)
 William Kurasch – strings (1, 5-7)
 Jay Rosen – strings (1, 5-7)
 Polly Sweeney – strings (1, 5-7)
 Lawrence Pecot Robinson – handclaps
 Debbie Robinson – handclaps
 Leslie Kearney – handclaps
 Dennis Moody – handclaps
 Darrell Cox – handclaps
 Bruce W. Talamon – handclaps
 Dianne Reeves – vocals (5, 6)
 Jessica Smith – backing vocals
 Julia Tillman Waters – backing vocals
 Maxine Willard Waters – backing vocals

Production 
 George Duke – producer
 Kerry McNabb – engineer
 John Golden – mastering at Kendun Recorders (Burbank, California).
 Nancy Donald – design
 Cynthia Marsh – artwork
 Bruce W. Talamon – photography

Chart history

Notes

References

External links 
 
 George Duke's 1970s discography on his website
 From Me to You by George Duke on iTunes

1977 albums
George Duke albums
Epic Records albums
Albums produced by George Duke